A Woman of Distinction is a 1950 American romantic comedy film directed by Edward Buzzell and starring Rosalind Russell and Ray Milland.

Plot
Susan Manning Middlecott is dean of a New England school called Benton College and it is her whole life, apart from living with dad Mark and raising an adopted daughter, Louisa.

A British astronomy professor she has never met, Alec Stevenson, mentions to a lecture-tour publicist named Teddy Evans that he has a locket belonging to Susan that he wants to deliver to her. For publicity's sake, Teddy invents a story that Alec and Susan are involved in a romance.

Susan is miffed and boards a train to Boston to confront him. She is unaware that Alec has been to her campus and is now on the same train. A photographer snaps their picture getting off the train. Susan, livid, hits Alec with her purse, and Teddy makes sure their spat makes the newspapers.

Susan believes that Alec is a publicity seeker, rejecting his attempts to explain. Susan's dad takes a shine to Alec and wants to encourage her to find time for a love life. To get away, Susan takes her daughter to the family's cabin, but Mark also invites Alec there.

The locket was given to Alec by a concentration camp prisoner named Benoit during the war. Alec tells her how he merely was attempting to bring it to her at the soldier's request. He and Susan attend a college dance, but another misunderstanding prompts her to leave with a student, who promptly gets Susan in trouble by drag racing with another car.

Teddy plants a story that Alec is the real father of Susan's little girl. Susan's job is now in jeopardy from the continuing bad publicity. Alec tries to cover for her, claiming he and Susan are actually married, but a college colleague does likewise, complicating Susan's situation further. She must decide what's important to her in the end, her professional life or her personal one.

Cast
Rosalind Russell as Susan Manning Middlecott
Ray Milland as Prof. Alexander "Alec" Stevenson
Edmund Gwenn as Mark "JM" Middlecott
Janis Carter as Teddy Evans
Mary Jane Saunders as Louisa Middlecott
Lucille Ball as herself

References

External links

1950 films
Films directed by Edward Buzzell
American romantic comedy films
1950 romantic comedy films
Films with screenplays by Frank Tashlin
Columbia Pictures films
1950s English-language films
Films set in Boston
American black-and-white films
1950s American films